Kogi State is a state in the North Central region of Nigeria, bordered to the west by the states of Ekiti and Kwara, to the north by the Federal Capital Territory, to the northeast by Nasarawa State, to the northwest by Niger State, to the southwest by the Edo and Ondo states, to the southeast by the states of Anambra and Enugu, and to the east by Benue State. It is the only state in Nigeria to border ten other states. Named for the Hausa word for river (Kogi). Kogi State was formed from parts of Benue State, Niger State, and Kwara State on 27 August 1991. The state is nicknamed the "Confluence State" due to the fact that the confluence of the River Niger and the River Benue occurs next to its capital, Lokoja.

Of the 36 states of Nigeria, Kogi is the thirteenth largest in the area and twentieth most populous with an estimated population of about 4.5  million as of 2016. Geographically, the state is within the tropical Guinean forest–savanna mosaic ecoregion. Important geographic features include the key rivers with the Niger flowing from the northwest and the Benue coming from the northeast before the two rivers meet in Kogi's center and bisect the state southward.

Kogi State has been inhabited for years by various ethnic groups, including the Igala, Ebira, Gbagyi, and Nupe (mainly the Bassa Nge, Kakanda, and Kupa subgroups) in the state's center; the Agatu, Basa-Komo, Idoma, and Igbo in the east; and the Yoruba (mainly the Okun, Ogori, Oworo, and Magongo subgroups) in the west. Kogi is also religiously diverse as about 45% of the state's population are Muslim with about 40% being Christian and the remaining 15% following traditional ethnic religions minorities.

In the pre-colonial period, the area that is now Kogi State was split up between various states with some states being tiny and village-based as others were part of larger empires like the Nupe Kingdom which held much of now-western Kogi State until the early 1800s when the Fulani jihad annexed the kingdom and placed the area under the Sokoto Caliphate. In the 1900s and 1910s, British expeditions occupied the area and incorporated them into the Northern Nigeria Protectorate with its capital as Lokoja until 1903. The protectorate later merged into British Nigeria before becoming independent as Nigeria in 1960. Originally, modern-day Kogi State was a part of the post-independence Northern Region until 1967 when the region was split and the area became part of the North-Western State, Kwara State, and Benue-Plateau State. After Benue-Plateau and the North-Western states were split in 1976, Kogi became a part of the new Benue and Niger states along with Kwara. Western Benue State, southeastern Kwara State, and far southern Niger State were broken off to form the new Kogi State.

Economically, Kogi State is largely based around agriculture, mainly of coffee, cashew, groundnut, cocoa, oil palm, and yam crops. Other key industries are crude oil extraction and the livestock herding of cattle, goats, and sheep. Kogi has both the 23rd highest Human Development Index and GDP in the country.

Climate
The climate of the state has an annual rainfall total of between 1,100mm and 1,300mm. The rainy season lasts from April to October each year while the dry season last from November to march. The dry season is very dusty and cold as a result of the north-easterly winds, which bring in the harmattan. Between 2001 and 2014 the built-up area increased by 10.68% and seven (7) adaptation strategies were employed by farmers in changing planting dates and change crop variety at 31%, 22%, and 21% respectively in response to change in rainfall.

Politics 
The State government is led by a democratically elected governor who works closely with members of the state's house of assembly. The Capital city of the State is Lokoja

Electoral system 
The electoral system of each state is selected using a modified two-round system. To be elected in the first round, a candidate must receive the plurality of the vote and over 25% of the vote in at least two -thirds of the State's and local government Areas. If no candidate passes the threshold, a second round will be held between the top candidate and the next candidate to have received a plurality of votes in the highest number of local government Areas.

Flooding 
In October 2022, Kogi State witnessed one of the worst flood disaster in the history of the state. This is according to the state governor, Yahaya Bello, who said that "flooding has affected the nine LGAs which borders the Niger and Benue rivers to include, Lokoja, Kogi-Koto, Ajaokuta, Ofu, Igalamela-Odolu, Bassa, Idah, Ibaji and Omala".

Adjacent States
 Federal Capital Territory (Nigeria) – to the north
 Nasarawa State – to the northeast
 Benue State – to the east
 Enugu State – to the southeast
 Anambra State – to the south
 Edo State – to the southwest
 Ondo State – to the west
 Ekiti State – to the west
 Kwara State – to the west
 Niger State – to the north

Kogi state is the only state in Nigeria that shares a boundary with ten other states.

History and people
The state was created in 1991 from parts of Kwara State and Benue State. Igala is the majority ethnic group in the state. The state as presently constituted comprises the people of the Kabba Province of Northern Nigeria. 

There are three main ethnic groups and languages in Kogi: Igala, Ebira, and Okun (a Yoruba Group) with others such as Bassa Nge of Bassa L.G.A, Kupa and Kakanda speakers, who are a people of Nupe extraction under Lokoja L.G.A., Bassa-Komo which is also of Bassa Local government area, Oworo people (A Yoruba Group), Igbo, Ogori Magongo, and Idoma.

The name Nigeria, was coined in Lokoja by Flora Shaw in the hill of Mount Patti, the future wife of Baron Lugard, a British colonial administrator, while gazing out at the river Niger .

Languages
The main languages are Igala, Ebira and Okun (a dialect of the Yoruba language. Other languages include Nupe, Igbo, Kakanda, Kupa, Bassa Nge and Basa Komu.It is one of the northern states in Nigeria without the Hausa language being dominant.

The Okun (Yoruba) language is spoken in the Kogi West Senatorial District and Igbo is spoken in border areas.

Local government areas

Kogi State consists of twenty-one (21) local government areas. Which are:

 Adavi
 Ajaokuta
 Ankpa
 Bassa
 Dekina
 Ibaji
 Idah
 Igalamela-Odolu
 Ijumu
 Kabba/Bunu
 Koton Karfe
 Lokoja
 Mopa-Muro
 Ofu
 Ogori/Magongo
 Okehi
 Okene
 Olamaboro
 Omala
 Yagba East
 Yagba West

Tourism

Tourist attractions in Kogi State include the colonial relics (such as Lord Lugard House), Mount Patti, World War Cenotaph, the confluence of Rivers Niger and Benue, Ogidi (An African town with formations of Igneous Rock mountains and a traditional art & craft industry) and natural land features hills and terrains that serve as hiking trails .

Being a 2-hour drive from Abuja some tourists come for day trips. Kogi State Tourism and Hotels Company Limited was established to promote tourism in the state. The state Government plans and Harness the high potentials of tourism including the development of historical landmarks at Lokoja.

Transport and communications
Kogi State connects the Federal Capital Territory with 22 Southern States. Being in close proximity to the federal capital territory, Abuja International Airport serves as the national and international gateway for air travelers from and to the state. Good telecommunications services are available in the state.

Agriculture and resources
Agriculture is the mainstay of the economy. There are many Farm produce from the state notably coffee, cocoa, palm oil, cashews, groundnuts, maize, cassava, yam, rice and melon.

Mineral resources include coal, limestone, iron, petroleum and tin.  The state is home to the largest iron and steel industry in Nigeria known as Ajaokuta Steel Company Limited and one of the largest cement factories in Africa, the Obajana Cement Factory.

Education
Kogi state is home to the Federal University (Lokoja), Kogi State University Anyigba, Confluence University of Science and Technology Osara, Federal Polytechnic Idah,Kogi State Polytechnic (Lokoja), Federal College of Education (Okene), College of Education (Ankpa), College of Agriculture Kabba, Kogi state college of education, technical (Kabba) and the Private Salem University, Lokoja. There are a college of nursing and midwifery in Anyigba and Obangede, a School of health tech in Idah, and ECWA School of Nursing in Egbe.

Sports
Kogi State has produced sprinters such as Sunday Bada and other sportsmen, who have contributed to the growth of sports worldwide. Kogi United and Babanawa F.C. are football teams based in the state. Other sports, such as swimming, handball, and table tennis are actively promoted in the state. The Kogi state Sports Council had a track record of Directors and a great personnel team Who at one time or another other had worked with the vision of putting the State fully on the world map. Among them are personalities like Mr. Francis Umoru, Mr. Mohammed Emeje, Mr. Benjamin O. Ameje, Mr. A. Ogido, Mr. Joel J. Abu and others.

Among other sportsmen produce by the state is Shola Ameobi, an Ayetoro Gbede born Ijumu, English footballer, currently playing for Bolton Wanderers as a striker, late Sunday Bada 400 Metres Olympic Champion from Ogidi in Ijumu Local Govt. of the state.

Senate
Three Senators have always represented Kogi state since the return of democracy in 1999 at Senate with Kogi East, Kogi West and Kogi Central producing one each.

Notable people
 

Halima Abubakar, Nollywood Actress.
 Segun Adaju, entrepreneur, CEO of Consistent Energy Limited and President, of Renewable Energy Association Nigeria (REAN).
 Pius Adesanmi, a Nigerian-born Canadian professor, writer, literary critic, satirist, and columnist. 
 Smart Adeyemi, Senator representing Kogi West senatorial district.
 Nasir Ajanah, a jurist who served as the Chief Judge of Kogi State.
 S. A. Ajayi, A Nigerian statesman who helped negotiate Nigeria's independence. Former minister of forestry, minister of education,
 Seth Sunday Ajayi, a scientist, scholar, and first African Professor Emeritus of Wildlife Ecology. 
 Esther Titilayo Akinlabi, Professor of Mechanical Engineering and Director of the Pan African University for Life and Earth Sciences Institute (PAULESI), Nigeria. She was also the Head of Department, of Mechanical Engineering Science, Faculty of Engineering and the Built Environment, University of Johannesburg (UJ), South Africa. 
 Shola Ameobi, a former professional footballer who played as a striker. 
 Tolulope Arotile (1995–2020), Nigerian Air Force female helicopter pilot.
 Sefi Atta, a novelist, short-story writer, playwright, and screenwriter.
 Abubakar Audu, first civilian and two-term governor of the state (1992–1993 and 1999–2003).
 Yahaya Bello, Governor of Kogi State (2016 until date). 
 Joseph Benjamin, Actor.
 Darey - Darey Art Alade.
 Abiodun Faleke, a business management/logistics consultant and politician. 
 Ibrahim Idris, former governor of the state (2003-2011).
 Jaywon, Musician.
 David Jemibewon, a retired Major-General who served as military governor of the now defunct Western State, and later as Minister of Police Affairs in the cabinet of President Olusegun Obasanjo. 
 Mercy Johnson, Nollywood Actress.
 Joseph Makoju, former GM of NEPA.
 Dino Melaye, former Senator from Kogi West.
 Oladele John Nihi, former President National Youth Council of Nigeria 2019 - 2020. Vice President West Africa, Pan-African Youth Union (2021 until date). 
 John Obaro, a technology entrepreneur, public speaker, and founder of SystemSpecs Nigeria Limited.
 Bayo Ojo, a former Attorney General of the Federal Republic of Nigeria.
 Nike Davies-Okundaye, a Nigerian batik and Adire textile designer. 
 Jide Omokore, a prominent businessman with interests spanning oil trading/exploration, marine, haulage services, steel, dredging engineering, and property development. 
 Edward David Onoja, former Chief of Staff to Governor Yahaya Bello 2016 - 2019. Deputy Governor of Kogi State (2019 until date). 
 Praiz, songwriter, Artiste.
 Idris Wada, former governor of the state (2011-2016).
 Folashade Yemi-Esan, head of the civil service of the federation.

Towns and villages
Okene

Ogugu

Ofante

Kabba

Lokoja

Gboloko

Oguma

 

Okenyi

References

External links
 Website

 
States of Nigeria
States and territories established in 1991
Natural disasters